Kafr 'Aqab is the northernmost Palestinian Arab neighborhood in East Jerusalem. It is part of the area annexed and included in municipal Jerusalem following its occupation by Israel in 1967. This area includes an additional approximate  of the West Bank, including territory which previously included 28 villages and areas of the Bethlehem and Beit Jala municipalities. Although the Jerusalem Law did not use the term, the Israeli Supreme Court interpreted the law as an effective annexation of East Jerusalem. The United Nations Security Council condemned the attempted change in status to Jerusalem and ruled the law "null and void" in United Nations Security Council Resolution 478.

Due to the Separation Wall effectively cutting the neighborhood off from the rest of Jerusalem, while no such barrier exists between this neighborhood and Ramallah and Al-Bireh, this neighborhood is practically part of the metropolitan area of Ramallah.

Location

It is bordered by Burqa lands to the east, Al Bireh to the north, Rafat and Qalandiya to the west, and Ar Ram, Qalandiya and Qalandiya Camp to the south.

History
The Palestine Exploration Fund's Survey of Western Palestine (SWP) suggested that Kafr 'Aqab was the Crusader village Kefreachab, which was one of 21 villages given by King Godfrey as a fief to the Church of the Holy Sepulchre.

Ottoman era
In 1517, the village was included in the Ottoman empire with the rest of Palestine and in the 1596 tax-records it appeared as Kafr 'Aqba, located in the Nahiya of Jabal Quds of the Liwa of Al-Quds. The population was 47 households, all Muslims. They paid a fixed tax rate of 33,3% on agricultural products, including wheat, barley, olive trees, vineyards, fruit trees, goats and beehives in addition to "occasional revenues"; a total of 3,100 akçe.

In 1838, Edward Robinson noted Kafr 'Aqab during his travels in the region, as a Muslim village, part of El-Kuds district.

An official Ottoman village list sometime around 1870 listed Kefr 'Akab as having 15 houses and a population of 65, though the population count included men, only. In 1883, SWP described it as "a small hamlet on the slope of a hillside, with a few olives."

In 1896 the population of Kefr 'akab was estimated to be about 135 persons.

British Mandate era
In the 1922 census of Palestine conducted by the British Mandate authorities, Kafr 'Aqab had a population of 189 Muslims, increasing in the 1931 census to 250 Muslims, in 59 houses.

In the 1945 statistics the population of Kafr 'Aqab consisted of 290 Muslims and the land area was 5,472 dunams, according to an official land and population survey. Of this, 829 dunams were for plantations and irrigable land, 2,736 for cereals, while 10 dunams were built-up areas.

Jordanian era
In the wake of the 1948 Arab–Israeli War, and after the 1949 Armistice Agreements, Kafr 'Aqab came under Jordanian rule, and was annexed in 1950.

In 1961, the population was 410 persons.

Post-1967
After the Six-Day War in 1967, Kafr 'Aqab has been under Israeli occupation. The population in the 1967 census conducted by the Israeli authorities was 287, of whom 8 originated from the Israeli territory.

Israel has confiscated 2,037 dunams of land from Kafr 'Aqab in order to construct the Israeli settlement of Kokhav Ya'acov.

According to the Palestinian Central Bureau of Statistics, in 2006, Kafr 'Aqab had a population of 10,411. Primary health care for Kafr 'Aqab is obtained in Al-Ram. In 2007, Kfar 'Aqab was described as a middle class suburb.

While Kafr 'Aqab was unilaterally annexed by Israel with the rest of East Jerusalem and falls under its full jurisdiction, it is separated from Jerusalem by the Israeli West Bank barrier. Municipal inspectors never inspect the area beyond the barrier. This creates "a planning nightmare and developer's dream".

The al-Faruq mosque in Kafr 'Aqab offers weekly classes in the Islamic teachings of Hizb ut-Tahrir.

Current Developments

The Israeli Construction and Housing Ministry began preparing the master plan for a new Jewish neighborhood to be located at the northern edge of Jerusalem on land near the former Atarot airport currently inhabited by some 15 Palestinian families and will stretch up to the separation barrier, which will be the border between the new neighborhood and the Palestinian Kafr Aqab neighborhood. The land is slated to become part of the Palestinian state under U.S. President Donald Trump's peace plan. Though Kafr Aqab is considered to be part of Jerusalem, it is on the other side of the barrier wall.

Notes

References

Bibliography

 (p. 80)

 (Röhricht, 1893, RRH, pp. 16-17, No 74)

External links
Pockets of Lawlessness in the "Oasis of Justice" , Candace Graff, 2014, Jerusalem Quarterly, Institute for Palestine Studies
Border Homes, in Jerusalem but Not, Face an Existential Deadline, By David M. Halbfinger, Nov. 22, 2017, The New York Times
In highly rare move, Israel to demolish five Palestinian residential buildings behind separation barrier, Nir Hasson, Oct. 28, 2017, Haaretz
Welcome to Kafr 'Aqab
Survey of Western Palestine, Map 17: IAA, Wikimedia commons
Kafr 'Aqab village (fact sheet), Applied Research Institute–Jerusalem, ARIJ
Kafr 'Aqab village profile, ARIJ
Kafr 'Aqab aerial photo, ARIJ
Locality Development Priorities and Needs in Kafr 'Aqab, ARIJ

Towns in the West Bank
Arab neighborhoods in Jerusalem
Municipalities of the State of Palestine